John McLean (1785–1861) was an American jurist and politician.

John McLean may also refer to:

Politics
 John McLean (Illinois politician) (1791–1830), Illinois politician and U.S. Senator
 John McLean Jr. (1793–1858), New York politician
 John McLean (New Zealand politician) (1818–1902), member of the New Zealand Legislative Council
 John Donald McLean (1820–1866), politician and colonial Treasurer of Queensland
 John McLean (Canadian politician) (1846–1936), Canadian politician from Prince Edward Island
 John R. McLean (Canadian politician) (1906–1964), merchant and political figure on Prince Edward Island

Sports
 John McLean (athlete) (1878–1955), American Olympic athlete and head football coach at Missouri, 1903–1905
 John McLean (rower) (1859–1925), Australian sculler
 Jock McLean (John Calderwood McLean, 1908–1988), Scottish footballer
 John McLean (footballer, born 1872) (1872–?), Scottish footballer
 John McLean (footballer, born 1877) (1877–1958), Scottish footballer
 Johnny McLean (1881–?), Scottish footballer

Other
 John McLean (merchant) (1761–1823), Massachusetts merchant, major donor to the Massachusetts General Hospital and Harvard University
 John McLean (furniture maker) (1770–1825), English Upholder and cabinet maker
 John McLean (explorer) (c. 1799–1890), Scoto-Canadian trapper, explorer, and author
 John McLean (bishop) (1828–1866), first Bishop of Saskatchewan
 John R. McLean (publisher) (1848–1916), owner of The Washington Post, The Cincinnati Enquirer, and the Great Falls and Old Dominion Railroad
 John Walford McLean (1925–2009), British dentist
 Jackie McLean (John Lenwood McLean, 1931–2006), American jazz saxophonist
 John McLean (1851–1928), Scoto-Canadian Methodist minister and author who later changed his name to John Maclean

See also
 John McClane, fictional character played by Bruce Willis in the 1988 film Die Hard
 Jack McLean (disambiguation)
 John MacLean (disambiguation)
 John McClean (disambiguation)